Mercury(II) acetate is the chemical compound with the formula Hg(O2CCH3)2. Commonly abbreviated Hg(OAc)2, this compound is employed as a reagent to generate organomercury compounds from unsaturated organic precursors.  It is a white water-soluble solid, but samples appear yellowish with time owing to decomposition.

Structure
Mercury(II) acetate is a crystalline solid consisting of isolated Hg(OAc)2 molecules with Hg-O distances of 2.07 Å. Three long, weak intermolecular Hg···O bonds of about 2.75 Å are also present, resulting in a slightly distorted square pyramidal coordination geometry at Hg.

Synthesis and reactions
Mercury(II) acetate can be produced by reaction of mercuric oxide with acetic acid.

Inorganic reactions
Mercury(II) acetate in acetic acid solution reacts with H2S to rapidly precipitate the black (β) polymorph of HgS.  With gentle heating of the slurry, the black solid converts to the red form.  The mineral cinnabar is red HgS.  The precipitation of HgS as well as a few other sulfides, using hydrogen sulfide is a step in qualitative inorganic analysis.

Organic chemistry
Electron-rich arenes undergo "mercuration" upon treatment with Hg(OAc)2.  This behavior is illustrated with phenol:
C6H5OH + Hg(OAc)2 → C6H4(OH)-2-HgOAc + HOAc
The  acetate group (OAc) that remains on mercury can be displaced by chloride:
C6H4(OH)-2-HgOAc + NaCl → C6H4(OH)-2-HgCl + NaOAc

The Hg2+ center binds to alkenes, inducing the addition of hydroxide and alkoxide.  For example, treatment of methylacrylate with mercuric acetate in methanol gives an α-mercuri ester:
Hg(OAc)2 + CH2=CHCO2CH3 + CH3OH  →  CH3OCH2CH(HgOAc)CO2CH3 + HOAc

Exploiting the high affinity of mercury(II) for sulfur ligands, Hg(OAc)2 can be used as a reagent to deprotect thiol groups in organic synthesis. Similarly Hg(OAc)2 has been used to convert thiocarbonate esters into dithiocarbonates:
(RS)2C=S + H2O + Hg(OAc)2 → (RS)2C=O + HgS + 2 HOAc

Mercury(II) acetate is used for oxymercuration reactions.

A famous use of Hg(OAc)2 was in the synthesis of Idoxuridine.

References

Acetates
Mercury(II) compounds